Convoluella is a genus of worms belonging to the family Antroposthiidae.

Species:
 Convoluella brunea Faubel, 1974

References

Acoelomorphs